Malokaterynivka is an urban-type settlement in Zaporizhzhia Raion of Zaporizhzhia Oblast in Ukraine. It is located on the right bank of the Dnieper, dammed here as Kakhovka Reservoir, at the mouth of the Kinska. Malokaterynivka belongs to Kushuhum settlement hromada, one of the hromadas of Ukraine. Population:

Economy

Transportation
Kankrynivka railway station, located in Malokaterynivk, is on the railway connecting Zaporizhzhia and Melitopol. There is some passenger traffic.

The settlement has access to highway M18 which connects Zaporizhzhia and Melitopol.

References

Urban-type settlements in Zaporizhzhia Raion
Populated places on the Dnieper in Ukraine